Addlebrough is a fell in Wensleydale, North Yorkshire, England.

Bronze Age inhabitants built homes and enclosures on the fell's southern slopes.

Gallery

References 

General

Addlebrough – My Yorkshire Dales

Peaks of the Yorkshire Dales
Wensleydale